Aigle (French for eagle) was a French experimental rocket launched several times between 1960 and 1961. The Aigle was propelled by 984 kilograms of solid fuel and measured 55 cm in diameter. It could propel 360 kilograms of payload to an altitude of up to 6 kilometers. With the addition of an extra booster it became the Éridan.

References

Rockets and missiles